Atemtanais taikaha is a species of tanaidomorphan malacostracan crustacean found in New Zealand.

References

Further reading
Bird, Graham J., and Roger N. Bamber. "New littoral, shelf, and bathyal Paratanaidae (Crustacea: Peracarida: Tanaidacea) from New Zealand, with descriptions of three new genera." Zootaxa 3676.1 (2013): 1-71.

External links

WORMS

Malacostraca
Marine crustaceans of New Zealand